The second USS Memphis was a 7-gun screw steamer, built by William Denny and Brothers, Dumbarton, Scotland in 1861, which briefly served as a Confederate blockade runner before being captured and taken into the Union Navy during the American Civil War. She was destroyed by fire in 1883.

Description
She was powered by a 2-cylinder steam engine having cylinders of  diameter by  stroke.

History
Memphis was built by William Denny and Brothers, Dumbarton, United Kingdom for Peter Denny and Thomas Begbie. She was launched on April 3, 1862. Her port of registry was London and the United Kingdom Official Number 44836 was allocated.

Civil War service

Confederate blockade runner
Memphis — on her maiden voyage, while running the Union blockade of Confederate ports on June 23, 1862 — ran aground off Sullivan's Island, South Carolina while attempting to enter Charleston harbor. Efficient work by Southern troops got her partially unloaded on the following day, and she was towed to safety by the steamships Etiwan and Marlon before Federal warships could hit her with shell fire. They were kept at bay by gunfire from Fort Beauregard. Memphis was captured by sidewheel gunboat  outbound from Charleston with a cargo of cotton on July 31, 1862, and purchased by the Union Navy from a prize court at New York City on September 4, 1862.

Union blockade ship
Memphis was commissioned on October 4, 1862, Acting Volunteer Lieutenant Pendleton G. Watmough in command. Assigned to the South Atlantic Blockading Squadron, Memphis sailed for Charleston and began service on October 14 with the capture of British steamer Ouachita bound for Havana, Cuba. She continued patrol in 1862–1863. On January 4, 1863, she joined sidewheel steamer  in taking Confederate sloop Mercury with a cargo of turpentine for Nassau, Bahamas. On January 31, Confederate ironclads CSS Palmetto State and CSS Chicora made a dash out of Charleston Harbor into the midst of the blockading ships. Screw steamer  was rammed and disabled by Palmetto State while sidewheel steamer  was next attacked and left for Memphis to take in tow. The two rams then retired.

By March of the following year, Memphis was operating in the North Edisto River. On March 6, 1864, Confederate torpedo boat CSS David attempted a run on the Union blockader. The spar torpedo struck Memphis port quarter but did not explode. After her second torpedo misfired, David retreated upstream out of range of her foe's heavy guns. Memphis, uninjured, continued her blockading duties to the end of the Civil War.

Post-war
On May 6, 1867, Memphis was decommissioned, and sold to V. Brown & Co., at New York on May 8, 1869. Renamed Mississippi, She was sold to William Weld & Co. of Boston, Massachusetts. On May 12, 1869, she was reported to have been wrecked on Mauritius. On 29 August 1871, she was reported to have been wrecked in the Hatteras Inlet during a hurricane. All on board were rescued. She was on a voyage from New York to New Orleans, Louisiana. Mississippi was sold c.1875 to Frederick Baker, Boston. In 1879, she was sold to H. Hastings & Co., Boston. Mississippi was sold in 1881 to Edward Lawrence, New York. She was sold in 1882 to the Oregon Improvement Co, Portland, Oregon. On May 13, 1883, when she was gutted by a dock fire at Seattle, Washington.

See also
 List of ships captured in the 19th century#American Civil War
 Bibliography of early United States naval history#American Civil War

References

 

1862 ships
Ships built on the River Clyde
Steamships of the United Kingdom
Merchant ships of the United Kingdom
Steamships of the United States Navy
Ships of the Union Navy
Steamships of the United States
Merchant ships of the United States
Maritime incidents in June 1862
Maritime incidents in May 1869
Maritime incidents in August 1871
Maritime incidents in May 1883
Shipwrecks of the Washington coast
Ship fires